The kinglet manakin or eastern striped manakin (Machaeropterus regulus) is a small South American species of passerine bird in the manakin family Pipridae. It is found in the Atlantic Forest of south eastern Brazil. It was formerly considered conspecific with the striolated manakin (Machaeropterus striolatus) with the common name "striped manakin". Males have a bright red crown, which the females lack.

The kinglet manakin was described by the German zoologist Carl Wilhelm Hahn in 1819 and given the binomial name Pipra regulus. The species is now placed in the genus Machaeropterus that was introduced by the French naturalist Charles Lucien Bonaparte in 1854. The species is monotypic.

Like many other manakins, the males cluster in a leks to attract females.  After mating, the females rear the chicks on without the help of the males.

References

Loiselle, Bette A., John G. Blake, Renata Durães, Brandt T. Ryder, and Wendy Tori. "Environmental and spatial segregation of leks among six co-occurring species of manakins (Pipridae) in eastern Ecuador." Auk, The (2007). BNet Research Center. Evergreen State College. 9 Nov. 2007 .

Kinglet manakin
Birds of the Atlantic Forest
Kinglet manakin
Kinglet manakin
Taxonomy articles created by Polbot